Curt, Kurt, or Curtis Hansen or Hanson is the name of:

 Curt Hansen (chess player) (born 1964), Danish chess Grandmaster
 Curt Hansen (actor) (born 1987), American actor and singer
 Curt Hanson (1943–2017), Iowa politician
 Curtis Hanson (1945–2016), filmmaker
 Curtis Hansen, judge
 Curtis Hanson, an actor who appeared in The Goonies
 Kurt Hansen (speedway rider), in 1986 Individual Speedway World Championship
 Kurt Hansen (footballer, born 1951), Danish footballer
 Kurt Hansen (footballer, born 1928)
 Kurt Hanson from National Outdoor Book Award